The 2007 Norwich City Council election took place on 3 May 2007 to elect members of Norwich City Council in England. One third of seats (13) were up for election. This was on the same day as other local elections.

Election result

After the election, the new makeup of the City Council was:

Labour 15 (-1)
Liberal Democrat 11 (-1)
Green 10 (+1)
Conservative 3 (+1)

|- style="background-color:#F6F6F6"
| colspan="7" style="text-align: right; margin-right: 0.5em" | Turnout
| style="text-align: right; margin-right: 0.5em" |
| style="text-align: right; margin-right: 0.5em" |
| style="text-align: right; margin-right: 0.5em" |
|-

Ward results

Bowthorpe

Catton Grove

Crome

Eaton

Lakenham

Mancroft

Mile Cross

Nelson

Sewell

Thorpe Hamlet

Town Close

University

Wensum

References 

Norwich
Norwich City Council elections
2000s in Norfolk